Hans Peter Schmoller (9 April 1916 – 25 September 1985) was a German and British graphic designer who worked as Head of Typography and Design at Penguin Books from 1949 to 1976. During his Penguin years he played a crucial role in postwar British typography, and has been described as one of the most influential typographers of the last century.

Early life and family
His father, Hans, was a paediatrician and his mother Marie owned a small business making and selling folded paper lampshades. He excelled in athletics as a child and in 1933 attempted to study art history at university, but was prohibited owing to his Jewish descent. Instead he applied to become a student of Rudolf Koch but Koch insisted on Hans receiving prior craft training.

In 1933 Schmoller began a four year apprenticeship as a compositor in the Jewish book-printing firm of Siegfried Scholem. He studied fine typography during the day at the Staatliche Kunstbibliothek and in evenings with Johannes Boehland at the Höhere Graphische Fachschule. 

As the situation in Germany worsened for Jews, Schmoller made efforts to move abroad. He received a letter from the Paris Evangelical Missionary Society in Basutoland (now Lesotho) to take a temporary job as manager of the missionary press. In December he returned to Berlin where he saw his parents for the last time, who were transported in October 1942. His father died of a heart attack in the Theresienstadt Ghetto soon after arrival, and his mother was murdered in the Auschwitz concentration camp in 1944.

Schmoller was interned in South Africa as an enemy alien from July 1940 to April 1942 and became a British citizen in 1946. He married Tanya Schmoller in 1950. In 1949 he replaced Jan Tschichold as Typographer at Penguin Books.

Accomplishments at Penguin 
 Buildings of England
 Pelican History of Art
 The Complete Pelican Shakespeare
 Chief examiner in Typography to the City and Guilds of London Institute

‘Hans Schmoller was one of the last species of typographers with a profound background of the history of types and with an eye nobody could fool.’ - Hermann Zapf

Notable publications
 Mr. Gladstoneʹs Washi. A survey of Reports on the manufacture of paper in Japan "The Parkes Report of 1871". Bird & Bull Press, Newtown, Pa. 1984.
 Hans Schmoller ; Tanya Schmoller ; Henry Morris: Chinese decorated papers. "Chinoiserie for three". Bird & Bull Press, Newtown, Pa. 1987.

References

External links

Schmoller Collection

1916 births
1970 deaths
20th-century German artists
Artists from Berlin
German graphic designers
Jewish artists
Jewish emigrants from Nazi Germany to the United Kingdom
Naturalised citizens of the United Kingdom
Penguin Books people